The Red River is a stream approximately  long in Lincoln County in the northwestern U.S. state of Oregon. It rises south of downtown Waldport and flows through the city to meet the Alsea River near the larger river's mouth on the Pacific Ocean.

See also
 List of rivers of Oregon

References

External links
Alsea Watershed Council

Alsea River
Rivers of Lincoln County, Oregon
Rivers of Oregon